Adrien Petit (born 26 September 1990 in Arras) is a French racing cyclist, who currently rides for UCI WorldTeam .

Major results

2008
 3rd Chrono des Nations Juniors
2009
 6th Trophée des Champions
2010
 1st Stage 2 Tour de Normandie
 2nd Grand Prix de la ville de Pérenchies
 3rd Road race, National Under-23 Road Championships
2011
 2nd  Road race, UCI Under-23 Road World Championships
 3rd Binche–Tournai–Binche
 4th Grand Prix de Fourmies
 9th Overall Tour de Wallonie Picarde
 9th Kuurne–Brussels–Kuurne
 9th Le Samyn
2012
 2nd Binche–Tournai–Binche
 3rd Road race, National Road Championships
 3rd Le Samyn
 4th Cholet-Pays de Loire
 6th Halle–Ingooigem
 9th Grand Prix de la Somme
2013
 1st Stage 4 La Tropicale Amissa Bongo
 1st  Points classification, Driedaagse van West-Vlaanderen
 3rd Le Samyn
 5th Halle–Ingooigem
 6th Grand Prix de Denain
 7th Trofeo Palma de Mallorca
 8th Binche–Chimay–Binche
2014
 1st Tro-Bro Léon
 3rd La Roue Tourangelle
 5th Trofeo Palma
 8th Kampioenschap van Vlaanderen
 10th Halle–Ingooigem
2015
 1st Prologue Tour de Luxembourg
2016
 1st  Overall La Tropicale Amissa Bongo
1st Stages 3, 5 & 6 (ITT)
 7th Omloop Het Nieuwsblad
 8th Binche–Chimay–Binche
 10th Paris–Roubaix
2017
 1st Grand Prix de la Somme
 1st Stage 6 Four Days of Dunkirk
 9th Paris–Roubaix
 10th Omloop Het Nieuwsblad
2018
 1st Paris–Troyes
 4th Le Samyn
 8th Overall La Tropicale Amissa Bongo
 10th Grand Prix de Denain
2019
 4th Schaal Sels
 4th Kampioenschap van Vlaanderen
 6th Gent–Wevelgem
 8th Grand Prix de la Somme
2022
 3rd Grand Prix de Denain
 6th Paris–Roubaix

Grand Tour general classification results timeline

References

External links

1990 births
Living people
French male cyclists
Sportspeople from Arras
Cyclists from Hauts-de-France
21st-century French people